Don't Tell Mom the Babysitter's Dead is a 1991 American coming-of-age black comedy film directed by Stephen Herek, written by Neil Landau and Tara Ison, and starring Christina Applegate, Joanna Cassidy, Keith Coogan, John Getz, Danielle Harris and Josh Charles. The plot focuses on a 17-year-old girl who assumes the role as head of the house when the elderly babysitter whom her mother had hired while she is away suddenly dies.

Don't Tell Mom the Babysitter's Dead was released in theaters on June 7, 1991 and grossed $25.1 million on a budget of $10 million. Despite moderate box-office success and receiving generally negative reviews from critics upon release, the film has gone on to gain a cult following on VHS and cable television.

Plot
Sue Ellen "Swell" Crandell is a 17-year-old Los Angeles high-school graduate who cannot afford to accompany her friends to Europe for the summer. When her divorced mother leaves for an Australian vacation with her boyfriend, Swell looks forward to a summer of freedom with her siblings Kenny, Zach, Melissa (along with her tri-colored Cardigan Welsh Corgi Elvis), and Walter.

Much to Swell's dismay, her mother hires a live-in babysitter named Mrs. Sturak, a seemingly sweet old woman who assures Mrs. Crandell that she can take care of all five children. As soon as Mrs. Crandell leaves, Mrs. Sturak shows her true colors as a tyrant, quickly drawing the ire of the children. However, she soon dies in her sleep. After Swell discovers the body, the kids worry that their mother will blame them for the death if they notify authorities. They agree to stuff Mrs. Sturak's body in a trunk and drop it off at a local funeral home with a note saying "Nice Old Lady Inside, Died of Natural Causes" while keeping Mrs. Sturak's car. They discover that the envelope their mother had given to Mrs. Sturak containing money for the summer is empty, and deduce that Mrs. Sturak had the money with her when they delivered her body to the funeral home.

With no money to pay the family's bills, Swell finds work at a fast-food restaurant called Clown Dog. Despite a budding relationship with her coworker Bryan, she quits because of the obnoxious manager. Swell then forges an extensive résumé under the guise of a Vassar-educated young fashion designer and applies at General Apparel West (GAW), hoping to secure a job as a receptionist. Company executive Rose Lindsey hires Swell as an executive assistant, much to the chagrin of Carolyn, a receptionist on Rose's floor who was initially in line for the job.

While the kids have dinner at Chuck E. Cheese, Mrs. Sturak's car is stolen by drag queens, forcing Sue Ellen to call Bryan for a ride home. Swell obtains the keys to her mother's Volvo and begins stealing from petty cash at GAW to support the family, intending to return it when she receives her paycheck. Later, Swell is furious to discover that her siblings have stolen the petty-cash funds from her purse to buy extravagant gifts: Zach purchases a diamond ring for his girlfriend Cynthia and Walter orders a state-of-the-art home-entertainment center. Walter falls off the roof while trying to adjust the antenna, breaking his leg and forcing Swell to pay for his hospital visit.

At work, the inexperienced Swell must balance the adult responsibilities thrust upon her while still trying to enjoy herself as a teenager. The double life strains her relationship with Bryan when she discovers that he is Carolyn's brother. Resentful of Swell's promotion, Carolyn and her coworker Bruce repeatedly try to discredit Swell's accomplishments, even going so far as to make a copy of Swell's driver's license to prove she is only a teenager, but Rose views the efforts as the product of Carolyn's petty jealousy. Swell must also rebuff the unwelcome sexual advances of Rose's philandering boyfriend Gus, who also works with the company.

When she learns that GAW is in danger of going out of business, Swell takes it upon herself to create a new clothing line, and Rose suggests holding a fashion show to exhibit the new designs. With no petty cash left to rent a banquet hall, Swell offers to host the party, convincing her siblings to help clean the house, beautify the yard and act as caterers. Although Swell manages to pull off the party, it comes to an abrupt end when Mrs. Crandell arrives home early, forcing Swell to confess her lie in front of everyone.

Carolyn and Bruce find their vehicle vandalized by Kenny's friends while Rose breaks up with Gus. While apologizing to Rose after the party, Swell learns that her unique designs have saved GAW. Rose offers Swell a job as her personal assistant, but Swell declines so that she can attend college. Rose tells Swell that she can "pull some strings" to get her admitted to Vassar.

Swell and Bryan make up, but are soon interrupted by Mrs. Crandell who inquires about Mrs. Sturak. As the credits roll, two cemetery workers look over Mrs. Sturak's gravestone as they plan to use the money found on her to visit Las Vegas. The gravestone reads "Nice Old Lady Inside, Died of Natural Causes."

Cast
 Christina Applegate as protagonist Sue Ellen Crandell, the oldest of five siblings
 Joanna Cassidy as Rose Lindsey, an executive and Sue Ellen’s boss at General Apparel West
 John Getz as Gus Brandon, Rose's philandering boyfriend
 Keith Coogan as Kenneth "Kenny" Crandell, the second-oldest sibling, a slacker and a stoner
 Josh Charles as Bryan, Sue Ellen’s friend and love interest who works at Clown Dog
 Concetta Tomei as Mrs. Crandell, the siblings’ mother
 David Duchovny as Bruce, Head Inventory Clerk at General Apparel West
 Kimmy Robertson as Cathy Henderson, a dedicated office worker at General Apparel West
 Jayne Brook as Carolyn, a receptionist at General Apparel West who resents Sue Ellen for getting the job she’d expected to be promoted to
 Eda Reiss Merin as Mrs. Sturak, the Crandell kids’ deceased babysitter
 Robert Hy Gorman as Walter Crandell, Sue Ellen’s 11-year-old brother who is a TV fanatic
 Danielle Harris as Melissa Crandell, Sue Ellen’s 12-year-old tomboy sister
 Christopher Pettiet as Zach Crandell, Sue Ellen’s 14-year-old brother who’s lovestruck over a classmate
 Chris Claridge as Lizard, one of Kenny's friends
 Jeff Bollow as Mole, one of Kenny's friends
 Michael Kopelow as Hellhound, one of Kenny's friends
 Alejandro Quezada as Skull, one of Kenny's friends
 Bryan Clark as Dr. Permutter, an Emergency Room physician
 E.E. Bell as an Umpire at Melissa's baseball game
 Christopher Plummer as Howard
 Robert F. Newmyer and Brian Reilly as Mortuary Workers
 Bud as Elvis, Melissa’s tri-color Cardigan Welsh Corgi
 Dan Castellaneta as the voice of the animated babysitter seen in the opening credits

Production
According to writers Neil Landau and Tara Ison, the core idea for the film originated in the mid-1980s. Landau was inspired by the 1983 film Risky Business, in which a high-school protagonist is thrust into the adult world and manages to hold his own. The first draft, titled The Real World, was finished in 1987 and sold to 20th Century Fox, but was shelved. Fox wanted a film with a lighter theme than that of the script written by Landau and Ison and envisioned "an actor like Winona Ryder in the starring role." Landau was uneasy with the hiring of Stephen Herek, then known for Bill & Ted's Excellent Adventure, to direct the film.

In 1989, the film was picked up by Outlaw Productions, which attracted Christina Applegate to the project through her Married With Children costar Ed O'Neill. Joanna Cassidy was cast as Rose Lindsey after a suggestion by Landau. The film was one of David Duchovny's early roles before he achieved mainstream success, but casting director Sharon Bialy had trouble convincing the studio to hire him. Jennifer Love Hewitt was originally cast as Melissa, but had to back out because Disney Channel would not release her from a television show in which she had been starring.

After the production ended, the studio was forced to change The Real World title because of a conflict with MTV's new television series of the same name, and settled on Don't Tell Mom the Babysitter's Dead. Landau was initially unimpressed with the revised title but accepted it after seeing Johnny Carson make a pun about it.

Release
The film was released on June 7, 1991, bringing in $4.2 million on its opening weekend and a total U.S. and Canada gross of $25,196,249, making a small profit but below the filmmakers' expectations. However, it achieved success on VHS and in HBO airings; reportedly, $1 million was spent on video-store advertisements.

Reception and legacy
Several reviewers compared the film unfavorably to the then-recent hit Home Alone. Peter Travers of Rolling Stone stated: "Blame the smash of 'Home Alone' for the new herd of kids-on-the-loose movies. Let's hope none are dumber than this one. ... There's no telling how the unflatteringly photographed Applegate delivers a comic line on the big screen, because [screenwriters] Tara Ison and Neil Landau haven't written her any," and concluded by calling the movie "the film equivalent of processed cheese."

Kathleen Maher of The Austin Chronicle described the film as "Home Alone meets Bill & Ted's Excellent Adventure and then visits Working Girl." Roger Ebert was slightly more positive, awarding the film 2 out of 4 stars and calling it "a consumerist, escapist fantasy for teenage girls." Desson Howe of The Washington Post wrote that the film "isn't quite as dead as you might expect" but that "it doesn't exactly pulsate with originality." He ended by complimenting the "subversive elements" that distinguished its otherwise "familiar, pre-sold air."
	
Rotten Tomatoes registers a 35% approval rating for the film based on 34 reviews. The critical consensus reads: "It has an amusing enough premise, but Don't Tell Mom the Babysitter's Dead will just leave viewers pining for the madcap hijinks promised by the title."

Despite the critical response on release, the film went on to achieve a cult following on VHS and television.

The film was mentioned by name in the first episode of the WB animated series Animaniacs. In the episode "De-Zanitized", the fictional Chairman of the board of Warner Bros., Thaddeus Plotz, says that he has not been this upset since they made Don't Tell Mom the Babysitter's Dead to Dr. Scratchansniff, when he chooses him to get the Warner siblings under control.

In June 2010, reports surfaced that a remake of the film would be produced by The Mark Gordon Company, though this has not taken place.

References

External links

 
 
 
 
 

1991 films
1991 comedy films
1990s American films
1990s black comedy films
1990s coming-of-age comedy films
1990s English-language films
1990s teen comedy films
American black comedy films
American coming-of-age comedy films
American films with live action and animation
American teen comedy films
Films about siblings
Films directed by Stephen Herek
Films produced by Julia Phillips
Films scored by David Newman
Films set in Los Angeles
Films shot in Los Angeles
HBO Films films